Bleptiphora is a monotypic moth genus of the family Erebidae. Its only species, Bleptiphora laurentia, is known from French Guiana. Both the genus and the species were first described by Schaus in 1916.

References

External links
Original description: Proceedings of the United States National Museum: 272.

Hypeninae
Monotypic moth genera